Minnesota Opera is a performance organization based in Minneapolis, Minnesota.  It was founded as the Center Opera Company in 1963 by the Walker Art Center, and is known for premiering such diverse works as Where the Wild Things Are by Oliver Knussen (based on the children's novel by Maurice Sendak) and Frankenstein by Libby Larsen.  Its latest commissioned piece and world premiere, The Fix – based on the story of “Shoeless” Joe Jackson, the Chicago White Sox, and their attempt to fix the world series. with music by Joel Puckett and libretto by Eric Simonson – was presented in February 2019. The President and General Director is Ryan Taylor, and the Artistic Director is Dale Johnson.

A number of operas have also received their American premieres at the Minnesota Opera, including The Handmaid's Tale, Postcard from Morocco, Armida, The Elephant Man, and The Fortunes of King Croesus.  The American premiere of Jonathan Dove's Pinocchio was presented in February 2009.

Minnesota Opera's season typically runs from September through April, with five productions per season and five to eight performances of each production.  Performances are given at the Ordway Center for the Performing Arts in Saint Paul, Minnesota.  According to OPERA America, the company is the 13th largest opera company in the United States.

Non-standard repertoire
While much from the standard repertoire is performed, the company has distinguished itself with productions of some unusual and rare operas in the last decade.

These include The Pearl Fishers; Casanova's Homecoming by Argento; and Roberto Devereux by Donizetti during the 2009/10 season; Pinocchio by Dove in the 2008/09 season; The Fortunes of King Croesus (Keiser) and Rusalka in 2007/08; Rossini's La donna del lago and  Offenbach's The Tales of Hoffmann. The Grapes of Wrath by Ricky Ian Gordon was given its world premiere in the 2006/07 season after being commissioned by the company. Léo Delibes's Lakmé appeared during that season as well.

The 2005/06 season saw several American premieres, including Orazi e Curiazi by Saverio Mercadante and Joseph Merrick, the Elephant Man (Petitgirard). In 2004/05 season, the company  presented Donizetti's Maria Padilla and Nixon in China by John Adams. Donizetti's Lucrezia Borgia and Passion by Stephen Sondheim appeared in 2003/04 while the previous season saw 
another American premiere, The Handmaid's Tale by Poul Ruders. In 2001/02 Mozart's La clemenza di Tito and Mark Adamo's Little Women provided a contrast. Early in the decade, Vincenzo Bellini's 
The Capulets and the Montagues and Kurt Weill's
Street Scene were highlights of the 2000/01 season.

In 2011, Bernard Herrmann's sole opera Wuthering Heights was presented.  The full opera has yet to receive a staging, as the official world premiere by Portland Opera in 1982 was abridged by some 30 minutes.

In 2011, Minnesota Opera produced Silent Night by composer Kevin Puts and librettist Mark Campbell, an MN Opera commission that won the 2012 Pulitzer Prize in Music. In 2013, Minnesota Opera commissioned the opera Doubt by composer Douglas J. Cuomo and librettist John Patrick Shanley.

In March 2015, the company gave the premiere performance of Kevin Puts' opera The Manchurian Candidate (based on Richard Condon's novel, with libretto by Mark Campbell).

In May 2016, Minnesota Opera produced The Shining, a newly commissioned American opera in two acts with music by composer Paul Moravec and a libretto by Mark Campbell, based on the novel by Stephen King. It is part of the 'New Works Initiative' of Minnesota Opera.
 
A complete list of earlier seasons' productions appears on the company's web site

Notes

External links
Minnesota Opera
Ordway Center
The Opera Lover's Guide to Minnesota

Arts organizations based in Minneapolis
Culture of Minneapolis
Musical groups established in 1963
Performing arts in Minnesota
1963 establishments in Minnesota
Minnesota opera companies